Child of the Hunt is an original novel based on the American television series Buffy the Vampire Slayer.

Plot summary

Lately Sunnydale, California has been missing kids, some of them have run away while others seem to have been kidnapped. There have also been attacks by little vicious creatures that completely mutilate their victims by simply biting through their prey. Also in town is a Renaissance Faire and the gang decides to pay it a visit. One visit is enough though because something is slightly off about the faire, everything seems evil and this one boy named Roland is continuously picked on, and not for fun either.

After some research and a couple of run-ins with some small attackers, Angel and Rupert Giles discover that a group of mystical beings called the Wild Hunt are in town to claim the souls of humans. Angel warns Buffy Summers not to look at them as if she does they will steal her soul and she will be forced to ride with the Hunt. Buffy hides Roland out in her basement to save him from the nasty Faire people. The next night Buffy comes home to find Roland stolen away by the Wild Hunt. Giles informs Buffy that the Wild Hunt is run by the Erl King, lord of the Wild Hunt, and that Roland is his son and the heir to the Erl King title even though Roland is disgusted by the Hunt. Buffy and the gang rush in to rescue Roland but their attempt to do so is of no use. To free her friend Buffy agrees to be bound by the oath of the Erl King in which she loses all willpower to fight against him.

On the night of the final Hunt in Sunnydale, the gang (without Buffy) assemble and begin an attack on the Wild Hunt before they can clear their magical forest to attack the town. Buffy is ordered to kill Roland by the Erl King and she must learn to fight against her magical oath in order to save her life, Roland's and the lives of her friends as well.

Analysis
The character Roland later appears in The Gatekeeper
Features the appearance of the slayer Lucy Hanover who appears in many of the Buffy books written by Christopher Golden.

Continuity

Supposed to be set in an alternative Buffy season 3. According to "canon" Angel should not get on with Giles at this point. In this book the two are friends.

Canonical issues

Buffy novels, such as this one are not considered by most fans as part of canon. They are usually not considered as official Buffyverse reality, but are novels from the authors' imaginations. However unlike fanfic, 'overviews' summarising their story, written early in the writing process, were 'approved' by both Fox and Whedon (or his office), and the books were therefore later published as officially Buffy merchandise.

External links

Reviews
Litefoot1969.bravepages.com - Review of this book by Litefoot
Nika-summers.com - Review of this book by Nika Summers
Shadowcat.name - Review of this book

1998 American novels
1990s horror novels
Books based on Buffy the Vampire Slayer
Novels set in California